Charles Harvey Dixon (1862 – 22 September 1923)
was a British Conservative Party politician.

Early life and education
Born at Watlington, Oxfordshire, he was the son of Dr Henry Dixon, coroner for South Oxfordshire. Dixon transferred from Lord Weymouth's Grammar School, Warminster to Abingdon School in September 1878 and was at Abingdon until 1881.

Career
He unsuccessfully contested the Harborough constituency, Leicestershire, in 1900, 1904 (by-election) and 1906.
He was elected as Member of Parliament (MP) for Boston at the January 1910 general election,
but retired from Parliament when the constituency was abolished at the 1918 general election. He was again elected as MP for Rutland and Stamford at the general election in November 1922,
sitting until his death in September 1923. His parliamentary interests were agriculture and finance.

He bought the Gunthorpe, Rutland estate from the Earl of Ancaster in 1906.

See also
List of Old Abingdonians

References

External links

See also
 List of Old Abingdonians

1862 births
1923 deaths
Conservative Party (UK) MPs for English constituencies
People educated at Abingdon School
People educated at Lord Weymouth's Grammar School
People from Watlington, Oxfordshire
UK MPs 1910
UK MPs 1910–1918
UK MPs 1922–1923